Joke Swiebel (born 1941) is a Dutch policy analyst, writer, politician and activist. Since the 1960s, she has been involved with the feminist and LGBT movements. She was one of the coordinators of the first LGBT action in the Netherlands, a protest against a discriminatory law on sexual relations, held in January 1969. She served as first chair of the Federation of Student Working Groups on Homosexuality and on the board of the COC Nederland while a student. After earning her candidate degree in 1972 from the University of Amsterdam, she led the political science library at that institution until 1977. She was involved in the creation of the women's studies program at the university and worked to coordinate between activist groups to ensure that neither gender or sexual orientation were the basis for discriminatory policies.

From 1977, Swiebel worked with various government programs to create policies that would assist women in gaining economic independence and equal pay for their work. From 1988, she simultaneously led the Dutch delegation for the United Nations Commission on the Status of Women and was their lead representative to the  1995 Beijing World Conference on Women. In 1999, Swiebel was elected to serve as a member of the European Parliament and served through 2004. Her focus was on human rights policy and she participated in discussions, introduced legislation, and wrote reports during her tenure regarding migration, women's rights, LGBT inclusion, and other issues. In 2006, she was one of the lead drafters of the Declaration of Montreal. Her written works have focused on policy and human rights implementation. In 2019, she was awarded the Jos Brink Oeuvre Prize for her lifetime of contributions to the LGBT community from the Dutch government.

Early life and education
Joke Swiebel was born on 28 November 1941 in The Hague, Netherlands. Her mother worked as a kindergarten teacher prior to marriage and her father, Cornelis Marinus Swiebel, served as the general secretary of the Social Insurance Council. He also was a member of the South Holland Provincial Council. A grandfather had served as a Social Democratic Workers' Party (SDWP) member of the Hague City Council. She attended the Montessori Lyceum in the Hague, graduating in 1960 and continued her education at the University of Amsterdam where she studied political science. In 1963, Swiebel joined the Dutch Labour Party, which was a successor of the SDWP. She graduated with a candidate degree in 1972 and completed graduate studies in library science in 1973.

Career and activism
In 1968, Swiebel was elected as the national chair of the newly formed Federatie Studenten Werkgroepen Homoseksualiteit (Federation of Student Working Groups on Homosexuality, FSWGH). The group was an umbrella organization, which coordinated activist associations of LGBT students in Dutch universities. Working with the Ruimte Youth Center, the FSWGH organized the first LGBT protest in the Netherlands. In January 1969, Swiebel and other members of the group handed out a pamphlet and a bag of candy hearts to the members of the States General of the Netherlands at the Binnenhof in the Hague to protest Article 248bis of the Dutch Criminal Code. The article established the age of consent for same-sex relations at 21 and for heterosexual relations at 16, as a method of discouraging homosexuality. She resigned from the FSWGH presidency in 1969 to accept a post on the board of the Cultuur en Ontspanningscentrum (Culture and Leisure Center, COC), a social organization for the LGBT community which had been established in 1946. Initially her work with the COC focused not on activism, but on forming a legal association. In 1971, the year that Article 248bis was abolished, she left the COC board.

Swiebel ran the political science library at the University of Amsterdam between 1972 and 1977. From 1973, she worked feminist groups like the Man Vrouw Maatschappij, coordinating actions to include sexual orientation in the fight against discrimination. She served on the University of Amsterdam's Grewel Committee in 1974 and 1975, organizing the university's women's studies program. In 1977, she began to work on the national emancipation committee, a government body that aimed to establish policy for women's economic independence and pay parity. She became head of the Emancipation Policy Coordination Office in the Ministry of Social Affairs and Employment in 1982 and served in that capacity until 1995. Simultaneously, Swiebel began serving as the head of the Dutch delegation for the United Nations Commission on the Status of Women in 1988 and was the vice chair of the commission in 1992 and 1993. She continued her service until 1995 and that year led the Dutch delegation for the United Nations' World Conference on Women, held in Beijing. The purpose of the conference was to create a strategic plan for the global efforts to support women's right to self-determination.

From 1995, Swiebel worked in various positions at the Ministry of Social Affairs and Employment, simultaneously serving as the chair of the Council of Europe's Steering Committee for Equality between 1989 and 1999. That year, she was elected as a member of the European Parliament and served until 2004. During her tenure, Swiebel was involved in legislation and produced reports which focused on free movement of persons throughout the European Union (EU), including asylum and migration laws. She proposed anti-discrimination legislation and an expansion of the EU Charter of Fundamental Rights, although her proposal in 2003 to adopt same-sex marriage for the EU was rejected until 2004. She worked on expanding equal opportunities and treatment of all persons in the member states and stressed the need to analyze the impact of anti-terrorism policies on human rights, noting that police misconduct and judicial deficiencies often impacted citizen's rights. 

After retiring from politics, Swiebel continued her activism, attending the International Conference on LGBT Human Rights, hosted at the 2006 World Outgames in Montreal. She was one of the primary drafters of the Declaration of Montreal. Her published works focus on human rights and policy. In articles such as Lesbian, Gay, Bisexual and Transgender Human Rights: The Search for an International Strategy, she has analyzed the different stances between the EU and the UN with regard to their ability to protect rights. Scholars like Elizabeth Baisley and Kathleen A. Lahey have noted Swiebel's conclusion that the diversity in member states of the UN makes its policies more susceptible to conservative, traditional and religious pressures than those policies adopted by member states of the EU. Among many other contributions, she served as the chair of the Dutch Coordination of the European Women’s Lobby and on the board of the International Archives for the Women's Movement from 2005 to 2007. The following year, she became chair of the International Gay and Lesbian Information Center and Archive, serving until 2012. Between 2013 and 2017, Swiebel was chair of the Clara Wichmann Association for Women and Law. In 2019, Swiebel was awarded the Ministry of Emancipation's Jos Brink Oeuvre Prize, for her lifetime of work on behalf of the LGBT community.

Selected works

References

Citations

Bibliography

1941 births
Living people
People from The Hague
University of Amsterdam alumni
Dutch LGBT rights activists
Lesbian feminists
Members of the European Parliament for the Netherlands
Dutch LGBT writers
Dutch feminists
20th-century Dutch women politicians
21st-century Dutch women politicians
20th-century Dutch women writers
21st-century Dutch women writers
Lesbian writers
Lesbian politicians
Dutch women activists
20th-century Dutch LGBT people
21st-century Dutch LGBT people